Finland competed at the 2020 Summer Paralympics in Tokyo, Japan, from 24 August to 5 September 2021. They won five medals; one gold, three silver and one bronze, all in athletics.

Medalists

Competitors
The following is the list of number of competitors participating in the Games:

Liisa Lilja was also qualified and selected but had to withdraw due to an injury shortly before the games.

Archery 

Jere Forsberg qualified to compete.

Athletics 

Six Finnish athletes (Toni Piispanen, Leo Pekka Tahti, Amanda Kotaja & Marjaana Heikkinen have qualified to compete.
Track events

Women's track

Field events

Cycling 

Teppo Polvi and Harri Sopanen have both qualified to compete.

Road

Equestrian 

Katja Karjalainen and Pia-Pauliina Reitti have both qualified to compete.

Paratriathlon 

Liisa Lilja was qualified and scheduled to compete but had to withdraw after being injured in a car accident shortly before the games.

Shooting

Finland entered one athletes into the Paralympic competition. Jarkko Mylly successfully break the Paralympic qualification at the 2018 WSPS World Cup which was held in Châteauroux, France.

Swimming 

Three swimmers, all male, have qualified to compete.
Men

Table tennis 

Aino Tapola qualified to compete. She is Finland's first female para table tennis player to compete at the Paralympics.

Women

See also 
Finland at the Paralympics
Finland at the 2020 Summer Olympics

References 

Nations at the 2020 Summer Paralympics
2020
Paralympics